Dan Cantwell is an American former tennis player.

Cantwell, a native of Salisbury, Maryland, was a collegiate tennis player for the University of Maryland. He won the Atlantic Coast Conference singles championship in 1990 and a two-time All-ACC.

In 1996 he featured as a wildcard in the main draw of the Legg Mason Tennis Classic in Washington DC, where he was beaten in the first round by Slovakia's Karol Kučera.

A graduate of the University of Baltimore School of Law, Cantwell now works as an attorney in Maryland.

References

External links
 
 

Year of birth missing (living people)
Living people
American male tennis players
Maryland Terrapins men's tennis players
Tennis people from Maryland
People from Salisbury, Maryland
University of Baltimore School of Law alumni